Alsberg is a surname. Notable people with the surname include:
Carl L. Alsberg (1877–1940), American chemist
Henry Alsberg (1881–1970), American journalist and writer
Max Alsberg (1877–1933), criminal lawyer of the Weimar Republic

German toponymic surnames